The following are the national records in athletics in Monaco maintained by its national athletics federation: Fédération Monégasque d'Athlétisme (FMA).

Outdoor

Key to tables:

h = hand timing

Men

Women

Indoor

Men

Women

Notes

References
General
Monégasque Athletic Records - Outdoor 18 September 2020 updated
Specific

External links
FMA web site

National records in athletics (track and field)
Athletics
Records